This article serves as an index – as complete as possible – of all the honorific orders or similar decorations awarded by Belgium, classified by Monarchies chapter and Republics chapter, and, under each chapter, recipients' countries and the detailed list of recipients.

Awards 
 For Leopold Recipients, please see: List of Grand Cordons of the Order of Leopold

Monarchies 
European monarchies

Belgian Royal Family

 King Philippe: 
 Grand Master and Grand Cordon of the Order of Leopold, military division
 Grand Master of the Order of the African Star (dormant), Royal Order of the Lion (dormant), Order of the Crown & Order of Leopold II
 Queen Mathilde :  Grand Cordon of the Order of Leopold
 Princess Elisabeth, Duchess of Brabant : Grand Cordon of the Order of Leopold
 King Albert II : Grand Cordon of the Order of Leopold, military division
 Queen Paola : Grand Cordon of the Order of Leopold
 Princess Astrid & Prince Lorenz : Grand Cordons of the Order of Leopold
 Prince Laurent : Grand Cordons of the Order of Leopold, military division
 Princess Claire : Grand Cordons of the Order of Leopold

Norwegian Royal Family
See also decorations pages (mark °) : Harald, Sonja, Haakon, Mette-Marit, Mârtha Louise, Astrid & Ragnhild

 King Harald V: Grand Cordon of the Order of Leopold, military division ° 
 Queen Sonja:  Grand Cordon of the Order of Leopold, civil division ° 
 Princess Astrid: Knight Grand Cross of the Order of the Crown°

Swedish Royal Family 

 King Carl XVI Gustaf:  Grand Cordon of the Order of Leopold (1977)
 Queen Silvia: Grand Cordon of the Order of Leopold (1977)
 Crown Princess Victoria: Grand Cordon of the Order of Leopold (2001)

Danish Royal Family 

 Queen Margrethe II: Grand Cordon of the Order of Leopold
 Crown Prince Frederik: Grand Cordon of the Order of Leopold
 Crown Princess Mary: Knight Grand Cross of the Order of the Crown
 Prince Joachim: Knight Grand Cross of the Order of the Crown
 Princess Marie: Knight Grand Cross of the Order of Leopold II
 Princess Benedikte: Knight Grand Cross of the Order of the Crown

Dutch Royal Family 

 King Willem-Alexander: 
 Grand Cordon of the Order of Leopold  (2016)
 Queen Máxima: 
 Grand Cordon of the Order of Leopold  (2016) 
 Knight Grand Cross of the Order of the Crown (Belgium) (2006) 
 Princess Beatrix: Knight Grand Cordon of the Order of Leopold - Civil division (2003) 
 Prince Constantijn: Knight Grand Cross of the Order of the Crown (Belgium)
 Princess Laurentien : Knight Grand Cross of the Order of the Crown (Belgium) (2016) 
 Princess Irene: Knight Grand Cordon of the Order of Leopold
 Princess Margriet: Knight Grand Cross of the Order of the Crown
 Pieter van Vollenhoven: Knight Grand Cross of the Order of the Crown

Luxembourgish Grand-Ducal Family 

 Grand Duke Henri: Grand Cordon of the Order of Leopold (1994) 
 Grand Duchess Maria Teresa: Grand Cordon of the Order of Leopold (1994) 
 Guillaume, Hereditary Grand Duke of Luxembourg : Knight Grand Cross of the Order of the Crown
 Stéphanie, Hereditary Grand Duchess of Luxembourg : Knight Grand Cross of the Order of the Crown
 Prince Guillaume: Knight Grand Cross of the Order of the Crown (1994)

Spanish Royal Family 

 King Felipe VI: Grand Cordon of the Order of Leopold
 King Juan Carlos: Grand Cordon of the Order of Leopold
 Queen Sofía: Grand Cordon of the Order of Leopold
 Infanta Elena, Duchess of Lugo: Grand Cordon of the Order of Leopold 
 Infanta Cristina: Grand Cordon of the Order of Leopold (1994)

Liechtenstein's  Princely Family 

 Prince Nikolaus: Knight Grand Cross of the Order of the Crown (as former ambassador of Liechtenstein in Belgium)

British Royal Family
 Queen Elizabeth II :  - 1963 - Grand Cordon of the Order of Leopold

Asian monarchies

Thai Royal Family 

 Queen Sirikit: Grand Cordon of the Order of Leopold (1960)

Japanese Imperial Family 

 Emperor Emperus Akihito: Grand Cordon of the Order of Leopold
 Empress Emerita Michiko: Grand Cordon of the Order of Leopold
 Emperor Naruhito: Grand Cordon of the Order of Leopold
 Empress Masako: Grand Cordon of the Order of Leopold

Former monarchies

King Simeon II: Knight Grand Cross of Order of the Crown (Belgium)

Iranian Imperial Family 
 Empress Farah: Grand Cordon of the Order of Leopold

Republics

President Georgi Parvanov : Grand Cordon of the Order of Leopold (2003)
 Zorka Petrova Parvanova : Grand Cordon of the Order of Leopold (2003)\

President Xi Jinping : Grand Cordon of the Order of Leopold (2014)

President Toomas Hendrik Ilves : Grand Cordon of the Order of Leopold (2008)
 Evelin Ilves : Grand Cross of the Order of the Crown (Belgium) (2008)

Nicolas Sarkozy : Commander of the Order of Leopold (ministre de l’Économie, des Finances et de l’Industrie, 2004)

President Tarja Halonen : Grand Cordon of the Order of Leopold (2004)
 Pentti Arajärvi : Grand Cross of the Order of the Crown (2004)

President László Sólyom: Grand Cordon of the Order of Leopold (2008)

President Vaira Vīķe-Freiberga : Grand Cordon of the Order of Leopold (2007)

President Valdas Adamkus : Grand Cordon of the Order of Leopold (2006)
 Alma Adamkienė : Grand Cross of the Order of the Crown (2006)

President Lech Wałęsa : Grand Cordon of the Order of Leopold
 President Aleksander Kwaśniewski : Grand Cordon of the Order of Leopold (1999)
 Jolanta Kwaśniewska : Grand Cordon of the Order of Leopold (1999)

President Jorge Sampaio : Grand Cordon of the Order of Leopold (2005)
 Maria José Rodrigues Ritta : Grand Cordon of the Order of Leopold (2005)

President Recep Tayyip Erdoğan : Grand Cordon of the Order of Leopold (2015)

Internal links 
 Mirror page : List of honours of the Belgian Royal Family by country

References 

 
Begian